Michael Eugene Archer (born February 11, 1974), better known by his stage name D'Angelo , is an American singer, songwriter, multi-instrumentalist, and record producer. He first garnered attention after co-producing the single "U Will Know" for R&B supergroup Black Men United. His debut studio album, Brown Sugar (1995), received widespread acclaim from music critics, who have credited the album for ushering in the neo soul movement; and was certified platinum by the Recording Industry Association of America (RIAA). Its third single "Lady", reached the top ten on the Billboard Hot 100.

He would then collaborate with artists such as Erykah Badu, Lauryn Hill, and then girlfriend Angie Stone. His next album, Voodoo (2000), debuted at number one on the US Billboard 200 and continued to receive critical acclaim. The album's lead single "Untitled (How Does It Feel)", earned him the Grammy Award for Best Male R&B Vocal Performance; likewise, Voodoo won Best R&B Album. Following this period, D'Angelo became increasingly uncomfortable with his growing status as a sex symbol. This was followed by numerous personal struggles, including alcoholism, which resulted in limited musical output for several years.

D'Angelo released his third studio album, Black Messiah, in 2014. The album was met with critical acclaim and peaked at number five on the US Billboard 200. The same year, D'Angelo was hailed as the next Marvin Gaye by GQ. D'Angelo also contributed to the soundtrack for the 2018 video game Red Dead Redemption 2, performing the song "Unshaken".

Early life 
D'Angelo was born Michael Eugene Archer in South Richmond, Virginia. His father was a Pentecostal preacher and D'Angelo was raised in an entirely Pentecostal family. Archer's musical talents were discovered very early as a child. He was 3 when spotted by his 10-year-old brother Luther, playing the house piano. After the formation of his native-Richmond, Virginia musical group, Michael Archer and Precise found success performing in the Amateur Night competition at Harlem, New York's Apollo Theater in 1991. The 18-year-old dropped out of school and moved to New York City as an attempt to develop his music career. The group previously enjoyed some notice in Richmond, evenly dividing their repertoire between soul covers and originals while D'Angelo accumulated compositions of his own and developed his songwriting skills. The group's turnout on Amateur Night resulted in three consecutive wins and cash prize, and upon returning home to Richmond, D'Angelo was inspired to produce an album and began composing material. This took place after a brief tenure as a member of the hip hop group I.D.U. (Intelligent, Deadly but Unique).

Career

1991–1995: Brown Sugar 
At the age of 17, D'Angelo met Afropunk Festival partner Jocelyn Cooper, who signed him to Midnight Songs LLC,  her joint venture publishing company administered by Universal Music Publishing Group after hearing a demo of the hip hop group I.D.U. (Intelligent, Deadly but Unique), which D'Angelo produced and rapped in. After signing, Cooper introduced D'Angelo to musicians Raphael Saadiq, Ali Shaheed Muhammad, and Angie Stone to collaborate as songwriters. Cooper then introduced D'Angelo to Fred Davis, Head of A&R and Gary Harris at EMI Music. After an impressive audition D'Angelo was signed to a recording contract in 1993. Cooper also introduced D'Angelo to attorney Kedar Massenburg who helped negotiate his contract. Massenburg later became D'Angelo's manager.

In 1994, his first significant success came in the form of the hit single "U Will Know". D'Angelo co-wrote and co-produced the song for the all-male R&B supergroup Black Men United, which featured R&B singers such as Brian McKnight, Usher, R. Kelly, Boyz II Men, Raphael Saadiq, and Gerald Levert. D'Angelo composed the music for "U Will Know", while his brother, Luther Archer, Midnight Songs LLC writer, wrote the lyrics. Originally featured on the soundtrack to the film Jason's Lyric (1994), the single peaked at number 5 on the Hot R&B/Hip-Hop Singles & Tracks and at number 28 on the Billboard Hot 100. The music video for "U Will Know" featured D'Angelo as the group's choir director; he reprised the role for the live performance of the song at the Soul Train Music Awards. That same year, he wrote and produced the song "Overjoyed" for the Boys Choir of Harlem, which appeared on their studio album The Sound of Hope (1994). The success of "U Will Know" helped build the buzz surrounding D'Angelo, which was followed by a number of highly promoted showcases, and added to the buzz among music industry insiders.

Brown Sugar was released in July 1995. Although sales were sluggish at first, the album was eventually a hit. The album debuted at number six on the US Billboard Top R&B Albums chart in the week of July 22, 1995. It ultimately peaked at number four in the week of February 24, 1996, and spent a total of 54 weeks on the chart. Brown Sugar also spent 65 weeks on the Billboard 200 and peaked at number 22 on the chart. It sold 300,000 copies within its two months of release. The album had been selling 35,000 to 40,000 copies a week through to November 1995, and by January 1996, it had sold 400,000 copies. With the help of its four singles, including the gold-selling Billboard Hot 100 hit "Lady" and R&B top-ten singles "Brown Sugar" and "Cruisin", the album reached sales of 500,000 copies in the United States by October 1995. On February 7, 1996, it was certified platinum by the Recording Industry Association of America, following shipments in excess of one million copies in the U.S. The album was certified gold in Canada on May 9, 2000. Its total sales have been estimated within the range of 1.5 million to over two million copies.

1996–2000: Sabbatical period and Voodoo 
Following the success of his debut album Brown Sugar (1995), D'Angelo went into a four and a half-year absence from the music scene and releasing solo work. After spending two years on tour promoting Brown Sugar, D'Angelo found himself stuck with writer's block. On the setback, D'Angelo later stated "The thing about writer's block is that you want to write so fucking bad, [but] the songs don't come out that way. They come from life. So you've got to live to write." During his sabbatical period, he generally released cover versions and remakes, including a cover-collaboration with Erykah Badu of the Marvin Gaye and Tammi Terrell duet song "Your Precious Love" for the soundtrack to High School High (1996). D'Angelo also covered Prince's "She's Always in My Hair" for the Scream 2 soundtrack (1997), as well as the Ohio Players' "Heaven Must Be Like This" for the Down in the Delta soundtrack (1998). He also appeared on a duet, "Nothing Even Matters", with Lauryn Hill for her debut solo album The Miseducation of Lauryn Hill (1998).

The much-delayed follow-up to Brown Sugar, Voodoo, was released in 2000 on Virgin Records after the EMI Records Group was absorbed by the former label. Voodoo received rave reviews from contemporary music critics. who dubbed it a "masterpiece" and D'Angelo's greatest work. The album debuted at number one on the US Billboard 200 chart, selling 320,000 copies in its first week. It entered the Billboard 200 on February 12, 2000, and remained on the chart for 33 consecutive weeks. As of 2005, the album has sold over 1.7 million copies in the US, according to Nielsen SoundScan. In 2001, Voodoo won a Grammy Award for Best R&B Album at the 43rd Grammy Awards which was awarded to D'Angelo and recording engineer Russell Elevado. The album was executive produced by then manager and creative collaborator, Dominique Trenier.

Its first two singles, "Devil's Pie" and "Left & Right", peaked at number 69 and number 70 on the Billboard Hot 100 chart. The latter was commercially aimed at R&B and hip hop-oriented radio stations due to the prominence of rappers Redman and Method Man on the track. According to Rich Ford, Jr., producer of the "Left & Right" music video, both the single and the video went commercially unnoticed due to MTV's refusal to place the song's video in rotation, serving as punishment for missing the deadline for its initial premiere. The fifth single "Feel Like Makin' Love" was less successful, reaching number 109 on the Hot R&B/Hip-Hop Singles & Tracks. "Send It On", the album's fourth single, achieved moderate chart success, peaking at number 33 on Billboards Pop Singles chart. The album's third single, "Untitled (How Does It Feel)", became its greatest chart success, peaking at number 25 on the Hot 100 Singles and at number two on the R&B Singles chart. Its infamous music video helped in boosting the song's appeal, as well as D'Angelo's. Billboard wrote of the video, "It's pure sexuality. D'Angelo, muscularly cut and glistening, is shot from the hips up, naked, with just enough shown to prompt a slow burning desire in most any woman who sees it. The video alone could make the song one of the biggest of the coming year". It earned three nominations for the 2000 MTV Video Music Awards, including Video of the Year, Best R&B Video, and Best Male Video.

2001–2013: Second sabbatical, personal struggles and delayed album 
Towards the end of his worldwide tour in support of the album that same year, D'Angelo's personal issues had worsened, affecting performances. He became more conscious of and uncomfortable with his status as a sex symbol, and after the tour D'Angelo returned to his home in Richmond, Virginia, disappearing from the public eye. Several of D'Angelo's peers and affiliates have noted the commercial impact of the "Untitled (How Does It Feel)" music video and The Voodoo Tour as contributing factors to D'Angelo's period of absence from the music scene. His former music manager, Dominique Trenier, explained his disappointment in the music video's impact in a 2008 interview for Spin magazine. Trenier was quoted as saying that "to this day, in the general populace's memory, he's the naked dude".

According to tour manager Alan Leeds, the experience "took away his confidence, because he's not convinced why any given fan is supporting him."
Following the suicide of his close friend, MTV-affiliate Fred Jordan, in April 2001, he started to develop a drinking problem. As his alcoholism escalated, plans for a live album and a Soultronics studio effort, both originally set for after the tour, were scrapped, and impatient Virgin executives cut off funding for the expected 2004 solo album.

By 2005, D'Angelo's girlfriend had left him, his attorney had become displeased with him, and most of his family was not in touch with him. He also parted ways with manager Dominique Trenier and tour manager Alan Leeds. After a car accident and an arrest on DUI and marijuana possession charges, D'Angelo left Virgin Records in 2005 and checked into the Crossroads Centre rehabilitation clinic in Antigua. In 2005, his recording contract was acquired by J Records, following rumors of D'Angelo signing to Bad Boy Records. Despite no solo output, D'Angelo collaborated with some R&B and hip hop artists during this period between albums, appearing on albums such as J Dilla's The Shining (2006), Snoop Dogg's Tha Blue Carpet Treatment (2006), Common's Finding Forever (2007), and Q-Tip's The Renaissance (2008).

D'Angelo's subsequent solo work was extensively delayed. Production for a full-length follow-up to Voodoo was stagnant, as he was working on and off mostly by himself during 2002. D'Angelo attempted to play every instrument for the project, striving for complete creative control similar to that of Prince. Russell Elevado described the resulting material as "Parliament/Funkadelic meets the Beatles meets Prince, and the whole time there's this Jimi Hendrix energy". However, those who previewed its songs found it to be unfinished. In the years that followed, D'Angelo's personal problems worsened, descending to drug and alcohol addiction. In January 2005 he was arrested and charged with possession of marijuana and cocaine. Various mugshots began circulating around the time, showing the singer looking overweight and unhealthy, in stark contrast to the muscular D'Angelo seen in promotion for Voodoo. In September 2005, a week after being sentenced on the drug charges, he was involved in a car accident, and was rumoured to be critically injured. However, a week after the crash a statement was issued by D'Angelo's attorney stating that he was fine continuing to say "He is anxious to finish the recording of his soul masterpiece that the world has patiently awaited.

No more was revealed on the new album until 2007, when Questlove leaked an unfinished track on Triple J Radio in Australia. Entitled "Really Love", the track was an acoustic flavored jam with a laid back swing feel. The leak apparently soured relations between the two. D'Angelo released a CD/DVD compilation album entitled The Best So Far…, first released on June 24, 2008 on Virgin Records. The compilation features songs from his two previous studio albums, Brown Sugar and Voodoo, as well as rarities and a second disc, a DVD of previously unreleased videos. Around the same time, the compilation was released digitally without the Erykah Badu and Raphael Saadiq featured songs, under the title Ultimate D'Angelo.

In late November 2011, D'Angelo announced a series of 2012 European tour dates. The tour kicked off January 26 in Stockholm, Sweden with its final show on February 10. The tour featured a selection of hits from his two previous albums and songs from his upcoming album, which was close to completion. He premiered 4 new songs: "Sugah Daddy", "Ain't That Easy", "Another Life" and "The Charade" which were well received. On June 9, 2012, he joined Questlove for the annual Bonnaroo Music and Arts Festival's Superjam. He didn't play any of his original material and this marked the first time in nearly 12 years that he performed on stage in the US. On September 1, 2012, D'Angelo performed at Jay-Z's Made in America festival where he again performed the new songs, "The Charade" and "Sugah Daddy". On October 7, RCA Music Group announced that it was closing J Records, Arista Records, and Jive Records.  With the shutdown, D'Angelo (and all other artists previously signed to those labels) would release his future material on RCA Records.

2014–2020: Black Messiah and "Unshaken"
D'Angelo released his third studio album, Black Messiah in December 2014. D'Angelo originally wanted to release Black Messiah in 2015, but the controversial decisions in the Ferguson and Eric Garner cases inspired him to release it earlier. On December 12, 2014, Kevin Liles, D'Angelo's manager, shared a 15-second teaser of the album on YouTube. Two days later, the track "Sugah Daddy", which had been part of D'Angelo's set list since 2012, premiered at 3am EST and 1,000 downloads were available on Red Bull's 20 Before 15 website. After an exclusive listening party in New York produced by Afropunk festival founder Matthew Morgan and Jocelyn Cooper, Black Messiah was released digitally on December 15 through iTunes, Google Play Music, and Spotify. The album's unexpected release was compared to Beyoncé's self-titled release in 2013. On January 13, 2015, "Really Love" was released to urban adult contemporary radio in the US.

The album was met with universal acclaim from critics and it currently has a 95/100 mean score on review aggregator Metacritic. In its first week of release, Black Messiah debuted at number five on the Billboard 200 and sold 117,000 copies in the United States. In its second week, the album dropped to number twenty five on the chart and sold another 40,254 copies. In the United Kingdom, it debuted at number 47 on the UK Albums Chart with first-week sales of 7,423 copies.
D'Angelo supported Black Messiah with a tour called The Second Coming. His band, once called "The Testimony" and later renamed "The Vanguard", includes drummer Chris Dave, bassist Pino Palladino, guitarists Jesse Johnson (The Time) and Isaiah Sharkey, vocalists Kendra Foster (sometimes replaced by Joi Gilliam), Jermaine Holmes, and Charles "Redd" Middleton, keyboardist Cleo "Pookie" Sample, jazz trumpeter Keyon Harrold, saxophonist Kenneth Whalum manning the horn section, and D'Angelo as the lead vocalist, playing the electric grand piano, electric guitar, and even the band's conductor at certain moments. D'Angelo and The Vanguard's Second Coming Tour commenced in New York on February 7, 2015, and concluded in Austin on November 6, 2015, with a total of 57 shows in Europe, Asia and North America. At the 58th Annual Grammy Awards, Black Messiah won Best R&B Album while "Really Love" won Best R&B Song and was nominated for Record of the Year. Black Messiah, Beyoncé's self-titled album (2013), Run the Jewels' Run the Jewels 2 (2014), and Kendrick Lamar's To Pimp a Butterfly (2015) were noted as laying the groundwork down for the politically charged releases that happened in 2016, which included Rihanna's Anti, Kanye West's The Life of Pablo, and Beyonce's "Formation".

In June 2015, D'Angelo confirmed to Rolling Stone that he was working on more material for a new album, calling it "a companion piece" to Black Messiah. D'Angelo performed Prince's "Sometimes it Snows in April" on The Tonight Show Starring Jimmy Fallon in April 2016 accompanied by Maya Rudolph and Gretchen Lieberum as a tribute to the late musician, appearing 'overcome with emotion' at the passing of a major influence. D'Angelo contributed to the soundtrack for the 2018 video game Red Dead Redemption 2. He sang on the song "Unshaken" which was produced by Daniel Lanois. He had previously served as a playtester for the game itself due to his love for the series. The game's music team eventually invited him to perform on a song, which was finished in a week. "Unshaken" was later released as a digital single on January 4, 2019.

2021–present: Verzuz 
On February 14, 2021, D'Angelo appeared on Instagram Live to announce that he would be performing at the Apollo Theater on February 27, 2021, in cooperation with the American webcast Verzuz. The event was billed as D'Angelo VS Friends and featured no opponents; instead, D'Angelo performed a solo set with shared performances with his peers and collaborators, Keyon Harrold, Method Man & Redman, and H.E.R..

On June 10, 2021, D'Angelo performed at the 2021 Tribeca Film Festival in New York City for "The Songs of Red Dead Redemption 2". He performed his 2019 single "Unshaken", which was his contribution to the game's soundtrack. D'Angelo performed as a guitarist and the lead vocalist, with soundtrack producer Daniel Lanois, singer Rhiannon Giddens, and members of his band "D'Angelo and The Vanguard", including guitarist Jesse Johnson and vocalists Jermaine Holmes and Charles Middleton by his side.

Artistry
In a 1995 interview, he discussed the influence that musician Prince had on his approach to recording his debut album, stating "I was one of those guys who read the album credits and I realized that Prince was a true artist. He wrote, produced, and performed, and that's the way I wanted to do it." According to D'Angelo, the hip hop influence present on the album "came from the Native Tongues movement – Tribe Called Quest, Gangstarr and Main Source." In a February 1999 interview with music journalist Touré, D'Angelo discussed his original inspirations to produce music, stating "The sound and feel of my music are going to be affected by what motivates me to do it". On his visit to South Carolina, D'Angelo stated that he "went through this tunnel, through gospel, blues, and a lot of old soul, old James Brown, early, early Sly and the Family Stone, and a lot of Jimi Hendrix", and "I learned a lot about music, myself, and where I want to go musically". In the same interview, he cited the deaths of rappers Tupac Shakur and The Notorious B.I.G. as having a great effect on him during the period. During the production of his second studio album D'Angelo recorded numerous hours of unreleased, original material, as well as covers of his influencers' material. Collectively referred to by D'Angelo as "yoda", these influencers included soul artist Al Green, funk artist George Clinton, and Afrobeat artist Fela Kuti.

Personal life
In the 1990s, D'Angelo dated soul singer Angie Stone. She was his muse for his Brown Sugar album and he helped her produce her debut album Black Diamond, released in 1999. Angie Stone and D'Angelo have a son together, named Michael D'Angelo Archer II, born in 1997. D'Angelo also has two other children: A daughter, Imani Archer, born in 1999, and a son, Morocco Prince Archer, born in 2010.

Discography

Studio albums
Brown Sugar (1995)
Voodoo (2000)
Black Messiah (with The Vanguard) (2014)

Tours
 Brown Sugar Tour (1996)
 The Voodoo World Tour (2000)
 Occupy Music Tour (2012)
 The Liberation Tour (2012)
 The Second Coming Tour (2015)

Awards and nominations

Blockbuster Entertainment Awards

!Ref.
|-
| 2001
| Himself
| Favorite Male Artist - R&B
| 
|

Grammy Awards

|-
|rowspan="3"| 1996
|| Brown Sugar
| Best R&B Album
| 
|-
|rowspan="2"| "Brown Sugar"
| Best R&B Song
| 
|-
| rowspan="2"|Best Male R&B Vocal Performance
| 
|-
|| 1997
|"Lady"
| 
|-
|| 1999
|"Nothing Even Matters" (with Lauryn Hill)
|Best R&B Performance by a Duo or Group with Vocal
| 
|-
|rowspan="3"| 2001
|| Voodoo
| Best R&B Album
| 
|-
|rowspan="2"| "Untitled (How Does It Feel)"
|Best Male R&B Vocal Performance
| 
|-
|rowspan="2"| Best R&B Song
| 
|-
|rowspan="2"|2003
|rowspan="2"| "Be Here" (with Raphael Saadiq)
| 
|-
|Best Urban/Alternative Performance
| 
|-
|2004
| "I'll Stay" (with Roy Hargrove)
| Best R&B Performance by a Duo or Group with Vocals
| 
|-
|rowspan="3"| 2016
|| Black Messiah
| Best R&B Album
| 
|-
|rowspan="2"| "Really Love"
| Record of the Year
| 
|-
| Best R&B Song
| 
|}

MTV Europe Music Awards

!Ref.
|-
| 1996
| "Lady"
| MTV Amour
| 
|

Pollstar Concert Industry Awards

!Ref.
|-
| 1996
| Himself
| Best New Rap/Dance Artist Tour
| 
|

Rober Awards Music Prize

!Ref.
|-
| rowspan=2|2012
| Voodoo
| Best Reissue
| 
|rowspan=2|
|-
| rowspan=5|Himself
| rowspan=2|Best Live Artist
| 
|-
| rowspan=5|2015
| 
|rowspan=5|
|-
| Best Group or Duo
| 
|-
| Comeback of the Year
| 
|-
| Best R&B
| 
|-
|Black Messiah
| Album of the Year
|

See also 
 Neo soul
 Soulquarians

References

External links

D'Angelo on imeem

 
1974 births
Living people
African-American male singer-songwriters
American male guitarists
Grammy Award winners
Music of Richmond, Virginia
American neo soul singers
Musicians from Richmond, Virginia
Singer-songwriters from Virginia
Manchester High School (Virginia) alumni
RCA Records artists
Virgin Records artists
EMI Records artists
Guitarists from Virginia
Record producers from Virginia
American contemporary R&B singers
Ballad musicians
Male pianists
Alternative R&B musicians
African-American guitarists
Soulquarians members
20th-century African-American male singers
21st-century African-American male singers
The Soultronics members